Pain de mie is a white or brown  bread with a thin, soft crust.

Description
Pain de mie is most similar to a pullman loaf, or to regular sandwich bread. Pain de mie usually has sugar in it, which makes it sweeter than most French breads. This bread is usually used for making sandwiches, or for toasting. It can be baked in a sealed pan, which prevents crust from forming. If not baked in a sealed pan, the crust can be cut off (as done in factories before packaging). Pain de mie is sold in rounded or rectangular shapes.

References

External links
 M. Malouin (1767) Descriptions des arts du meunier, du vermicelier et du boulenger , p. 221, L'Académie des Sciences (French)  

Yeast breads
French breads